Cyperus subbadius is a species of sedge that is endemic to Madagascar.

The species was first formally described by the botanist Georg Kükenthal in 1936.

See also
 List of Cyperus species

References

subbadius
Taxa named by Georg Kükenthal
Plants described in 1936
Endemic flora of Madagascar